Time Out for Smokey Robinson & the Miracles is a 1969 album by Motown group The Miracles. It reached #25 on the Billboard Pop Album chart, and contains four pop top 40 singles – "Doggone Right", "Abraham, Martin & John", "Here I Go Again" and the top ten pop smash hit "Baby, Baby Don't Cry". Time Out also features covers of Motown songs such as "For Once in My Life" and the Robinson-penned songs "My Girl" and "The Composer". Miracles members Marv Tarplin, Pete Moore and Ronnie White were also co-writers on several of the album's tracks, along with Motown staff songwriters Al Cleveland, Ron Miller and Terry Johnson. Miracle Pete Moore also co-produced two of the album's tracks, a prelude to his later production of the Miracles' massively successful platinum-selling City of Angels album of a few years later. The Miracles' Time Out album was originally released on CD in 1986, and again in 2001 coupled with their album, Four in Blue.

Track listing

Side one
"Doggone Right" (Robinson, Marvin Tarplin, Al Cleveland)
"Baby, Baby Don't Cry" (Cleveland, Terry "Buzzy" Johnson, Robinson)
"My Girl" (Robinson, Ronald White)
"The Hurt Is Over" (Robinson, Tarplin, Cleveland)
"You Neglect Me" (Robinson, Tarplin)
"Abraham, Martin & John" (Dick Holler)

Side two
"For Once in My Life" (Ron Miller, Orlando Murden)
"Once I Got To Know You (Couldn't Help But Love You)" (Johnson, Robinson)
"Wichita Lineman" (Jimmy Webb)
"The Composer" (Robinson)
"Here I Go Again" (Robinson, Johnson, Cleveland, Warren Moore)
"I'll Take You Anyway That You Come" (Robinson)

Personnel

The Miracles

Smokey Robinson – lead vocals
Ronnie White, Bobby Rogers, Warren "Pete" Moore (co-lead on "Doggone Right"), Claudette Robinson – backing vocals
Marv Tarplin – guitar

Smokey Robinson – producer, album executive producer
Warren "Pete" Moore and Terry "Buzzy" Johnson – co-producer on "Baby, Baby Don't Cry" and "Here I Go Again"
Funk Brothers – other instrumentations

References

1969 albums
The Miracles albums
Tamla Records albums
Albums produced by Smokey Robinson
Albums recorded at Hitsville U.S.A.
Albums produced by Terry "Buzzy" Johnson
Albums produced by Pete Moore